"I Don't Really Care" is the debut single by English rapper/record producer K-Gee, released in 2000. It was produced by K-Gee and Octave, and features vocals by singer Michelle Escoffery. The song reached number 22 on the UK Singles Chart in October 2000. It was included two years later on his debut studio album, Bounce to This.

Writing for the September 30, 2000 issue of Billboard, Kwaku said of the song: "'I Don't Really Care' uses a most unusual combination of influences: Miami bass rhythms, Vivaldi's Four Seasons string arrangements, and Beach Boys-hued stacked vocals, which contrast with K-Gee's rapping and singing." K-Gee himself said "I've got different things flying in my head at any one time. I was mixing it at one time, and as soon as I heard the strings, I could hear the Miami bass underneath it."

Track listings
UK CD single
"I Don't Really Care" (7" Radio Edit) – 3:19
"I Don't Really Care" (Big Booty Mix) – 5:55
"I Don't Really Care" (7" Video Edit) –	3:14

UK 12" single
A1. "I Don't Really Care" (Big Booty Mix) – 4:44
A2. "I Don't Really Care" (Big Booty Mix Instrumental)	– 4:44
B1. "I Don't Really Care" (Noodles Remix) – 5:20
B2. "I Don't Really Care" (Latino Mix)	– 4:35

Charts

References

2000 songs
2000 debut singles
Miami bass songs
British hip hop songs
Songs written by K-Gee
Instant Karma (record label) singles